Sari Yarqan (also Romanized as Sārī Yārqān; also known as Sari Yarghān, Sārī Yārīqān, Sārī Yārreqān, Saryargan, and Ser-i-Argan) is a village in Goyjah Bel Rural District, in the Central District of Ahar County, East Azerbaijan Province, Iran. At the 2006 census, its population was 155, in 33 families.

References 

Populated places in Ahar County